Jane Elizabeth Steen (born 1964) is a British Church of England bishop. Since June 2021, she has served as the Bishop of Lynn, a suffragan bishop in the Diocese of Norwich. Previously, from 2013 to 2021, she served as Archdeacon of Southwark; and before that, from 2005 to 2013, she served as Canon Chancellor of Southwark Cathedral, and also as Director of Ministerial Education and Canon Theologian for the Diocese of Southwark.

Early life and education
Steen was born in 1964 in Thornton Heath, Surrey, England. She was educated at the Old Palace School, an all-girls private school in London. From 1983 to 1987, she studied English literature at Newnham College, Cambridge. She graduated from the University of Cambridge with a Bachelor of Arts (BA) degree in 1988; as per tradition, her BA was promoted to a Master of Arts (MA Cantab) degree in 1990. She then spent a year working with elderly and disabled people in East Barnet, London.

In 1988, Steen returned to Newnham College, Cambridge to undertake postgraduate research in English. She completed her Doctor of Philosophy (PhD) degree in 1992. Her doctoral thesis was titled "Samuel Johnson and aspects of Anglicanism". She then spent a year bookselling and teaching undergraduates.

In 1993, Steen entered Westcott House, Cambridge, an Anglican theological college in the Liberal Catholic tradition. From 1993 to 1995, she also studied Theological and Religious Studies at Trinity College, Cambridge, graduating with a further BA degree in 1995. She then underwent a year of training at Westcott House in preparation for ordination and completed a Certificate in Theology for Ministry. She later studied canon law at Cardiff University, completing a Master of Laws (LLM) degree in 2016.

Ordained ministry
Steen was ordained in the Church of England as a deacon in 1996 and as a priest in 1997. From 1996 to 1999, she served her curacy at St John the Baptist Church, Chipping Barnet in the Diocese of St Albans. From 1999 to 2005, she was bishop's chaplain to Tom Butler, the then Bishop of Southwark. In 2005, she was appointed Canon Chancellor of Southwark Cathedral, and Director of Ministry and Training and Canon Theologian for the Diocese of Southwark. She was also an honorary senior lecturer at Canterbury Christ Church University from 2006 to 2011.

In December 2012, it was announced that Steen would be the next Archdeacon of Southwark in the Diocese of Southwark, in succession to Michael Ipgrave. On 14 April 2013, she was installed as Archdeacon in Southwark Cathedral.

Episcopal ministry
On 28 April 2021, it was announced that Steen would be the next Bishop of Lynn, a suffragan bishop in the Diocese of Norwich. She was consecrated a bishop at Norwich Cathedral on 23 June 2021: she was the first suffragan bishop to have been consecrated at that cathedral for at least 100 years. The principal consecrator was Sarah Mullally, the Bishop of London, assisted by Graham Usher, the Bishop of Norwich, and Michael Ipgrave, the Bishop of Lichfield.

Views
Steen voted in favour of the introduction of blessings for same-sex couples by the Church of England.

Personal life
In 1990, she married Preston "Pip" Steen.

References

1964 births
Living people
Church of England priests
20th-century English Anglican priests
21st-century Church of England bishops
Archdeacons of Southwark
Bishops of Lynn
Alumni of Newnham College, Cambridge
Alumni of Trinity College, Cambridge
Alumni of Westcott House, Cambridge
Alumni of Cardiff University
Women Anglican bishops